Frank Calloway (July 2, 1915 – September 1, 2014) was an American self-taught artist. Diagnosed with schizophrenia in 1952, he was committed to Bryce Hospital and the Alabama Department of Mental Health in Tuscaloosa. He lived in the Alice M. Kidd Nursing Facility in Tuscaloosa. His imagery was primarily agrarian, depicting the Old American South as he remembered it. He drew on butcher paper using crayons, pen and markers. The scrolls were either 24 or 36 inches high and Calloway made them anywhere from 8 to over 60 feet in length. While he claimed to be 112 years of age in 2008, research by gerontology experts deduced that he was actually born in 1915.

Work
While Calloway had always done some drawing, his prolific output as an artist dates from the time he took an art class in the 1980s. Some of his drawings, most of which portray the rural Southern United States of his youth, were part of an autumn 2008 exhibit at the American Visionary Art Museum in Baltimore, Maryland.

Select solo exhibitions
2011Frank Calloway, Andrew Edlin Gallery, New York

2009Frank Calloway: Pageants from the Old South, Andrew Edlin Gallery, New York

2006Kentuck Museum, Northport, AL

Select group exhibitions
2009In Through the Out Door, Andrew Edlin Gallery, New York

2008-09Marriage of Science, Art and Philosophy, the American Visionary Art Museum, Baltimore, MD

2006Consumer Art Exhibition, Montgomery Museum of Fine Arts, Montgomery, AL

Further reading
"Alabama Man Turns 112, Still Spends Days Drawing" USA Today Article on Frank Calloway (July 2008)
"Frank Calloway at Andrew Edlin" Elisabeth Kley, artnet (March 2011)
"LISTINGS: 'Frank Calloway: Pageants from the Old South' " Roberta Smith, The New York Times (May 8, 2009)
"Out Is In" N.F. Karlins, artnet (January 2009)
“Alabama Man Turns 112, Still Spends Days Drawing” Kate Brumback, Associated Press (July 21, 2008)

References

External links
 Andrew Edlin Gallery NYC Gallery representing the work of Frank Calloway

1915 births
2014 deaths
20th-century African-American artists
20th-century American male artists
21st-century African-American artists
21st-century American male artists
African-American illustrators
American illustrators
Artists from Alabama
People from Tuscaloosa, Alabama
People with schizophrenia